Mecosta Township is a civil township of Mecosta County in Michigan. The population was 2,435 in accordance with the 2000 census. The Village of Mecosta, which is also in Mecosta County, is in Morton Township, several miles to the east.

Geography

Demographics
As of the census of 2000, there were 2,435 people, 938 households, and 681 families residing in the township. The racial makeup of the township was 96.92% White, 0.49% African American, 0.66% Native American, 0.12% Asian, 0.21% Pacific Islander, 0.29% from other races, and 1.31% from two or more races. Hispanic or Latino of any race were 1.36% of the population.

There were 938 households, out of which 32.4% had children under the age of 18 living with them, 58.5% were married couples living together, 8.4% had a female householder with no husband present, and 27.3% were non-families. 21.1% of all households were made up of individuals, and 6.2% had someone living alone who was 65 years of age or older.  The average household size was 2.59 and the average family size was 2.99.

In the township the population was spread out, with 26.4% under the age of 18, 8.7% from 18 to 24, 28.5% from 25 to 44, 26.0% from 45 to 64, and 10.4% who were 65 years of age or older.  The median age was 36 years. For every 100 females, there were 99.6 males.  For every 100 females age 18 and over, there were 103.5 males.

The median income for a household in the township was $37,287, and the median income for a family was $42,321. Males had a median income of $32,337 versus $22,219 for females. The per capita income for the township was $18,494.  About 6.7% of families and 11.5% of the population were below the poverty line, including 17.4% of those under age 18 and 2.9% of those age 65 or over.

Notable residents
Charles C. Johnson (born 1864), Michigan state representative

References

Townships in Mecosta County, Michigan
Townships in Michigan